Hostěrádky-Rešov is a municipality and village in Vyškov District in the South Moravian Region of the Czech Republic. It has about 800 inhabitants.

History
The first written mention about Hostěrádky is from 1270. Rešov was founded in 1787. The two formerly separate villages are urbanistically connected since 1826. They were administratively merged in 1926.

References

Villages in Vyškov District